Lysenkoism was a political campaign led by Soviet biologist Trofim Lysenko against genetics and science-based agriculture in the mid-20th century, rejecting natural selection in favour of a form of Lamarckism, as well as expanding upon the techniques of vernalization and grafting. In time, the term has come to be identified as any deliberate distortion of scientific facts or theories for purposes that are deemed politically, or socially desirable.

More than 3,000 mainstream biologists were dismissed or imprisoned, and numerous scientists were executed in the Soviet campaign to suppress scientific opponents. The president of the Soviet Agriculture Academy, Nikolai Vavilov, who had been Lysenko's mentor, but later denounced him, was sent to prison and died there, while Soviet genetics research was effectively destroyed. Research and teaching in the fields of neurophysiology, cell biology, and many other biological disciplines were harmed or banned.

The government of the Soviet Union (USSR) supported the campaign, and Joseph Stalin personally edited a speech by Lysenko in a way that reflected his support for what would come to be known as Lysenkoism, despite his skepticism toward Lysenko's assertion that all science is class-oriented in nature. Lysenko served as the director of the USSR's Lenin All-Union Academy of Agricultural Sciences. Other countries of the Eastern Bloc including the People's Republic of Poland, the Republic of Czechoslovakia, and the German Democratic Republic accepted Lysenkoism as the official "new biology", to varying degrees, as did the People's Republic of China for some years.

Context

Mendelian genetics, the science of heredity, developed into an experimentally-based field of biology at the start of the 20th century through the work of August Weismann, Thomas Hunt Morgan, and others, building on the rediscovered work of Gregor Mendel. They showed that the characteristics of an organism were carried by inherited genes, which were located on chromosomes in each cell's nucleus. These could be affected by random changes, mutations, and could be shuffled and recombined during sexual reproduction, but were otherwise passed on unchanged from parent to offspring. Beneficial changes could spread through a population by natural selection or, in agriculture, by plant breeding. In contrast, Lamarckism proposes that an organism can somehow pass on characteristics that it has acquired during its lifetime to its offspring, implying that change in the body can affect the genetic material in the germ line.

Marxism–Leninism, which became an official ideological doctrine in Stalin's USSR, incorporated Darwinian evolutionary theory as its integral part. Initially, Lamarckian principle of inheritance of acquired traits was considered a legitimate part of the evolutionary theory, and even Darwin himself recognized its importance. Although the Lamarckian hypothesis was essentially abandoned in the West by 1925, it was still a part of the Soviet ideological doctrine. Besides the fervent "old style" Darwinism of Marx and Engels (which included elements of Lamarckian theory), two other factors prevented abandonment of the Lamarckian doctrine in the USSR. First, Ivan Pavlov, who discovered conditional reflex, initially announced that conditional reflex in mice can be inherited; his subsequent withdrawal of this claim in light of new evidences didn't lead to abandonment of Lamarckian doctrine by Soviet ideologists. Second, Ivan Michurin's work on plant breeding was interpreted by him as proof of inheritance of acquired traits, which bolstered anti-Mendelian theoretical views.

Soviet agriculture around 1930 was in a crisis due to the forced collectivisation of farms, and the extermination of the kulak farmers. The resulting Soviet famine of 1932–1933 provoked the government to search for a solution to the critical lack of food. Lysenko's attack on the "bourgeois pseudoscience" of modern genetics and the proposal that plants can rapidly adjust to a changed environment suited the ideological battle in both agriculture and Soviet society. State media published enthusiastic articles such as "Siberia is transformed into a land of orchards and gardens," "Soviet people change nature" while anyone opposing Lysenko was presented as a defender of "mysticism, obscurantism and backwardness."

In the Soviet Union

Lysenko's claims

In 1928, rejecting natural selection and Mendelian genetics, Trofim Lysenko claimed to have developed agricultural techniques which could radically increase crop yields. These included vernalization, species transformation, inheritance of acquired characteristics, and vegetative hybridization. He claimed in particular that vernalization, exposing wheat seeds to humidity and low temperature, could greatly increase crop yield. He claimed further that he could transform one species, Triticum durum (pasta wheat, a spring wheat), into another, Triticum vulgare (bread wheat, an autumn wheat), by 2–4 years of autumn planting. Since T. durum is a tetraploid with 28 chromosomes (4 sets of 7), and T. vulgare is hexaploid with 42 chromosomes (6 sets), Western geneticists at that time already knew this was impossible.

Lysenko further claimed that Lamarckian inheritance of acquired characteristics occurred in plants, as in the "eyes" of potato tubers, though the genetic differences in these plant parts were already known to be somatic mutations. He also claimed that when a tree is grafted, the scion permanently changes the heritable characteristics of the stock. This would constitute vegetative hybridization, which Yongsheng Liu and colleagues note could possibly occur by horizontal gene transfer.

Rise

Isaak Izrailevich Prezent brought Lysenko to public attention, using Soviet propaganda to portray him as a genius who had developed a new, revolutionary agricultural technique. Lysenko's resulting popularity gave him a platform to denounce theoretical genetics and to promote his own agricultural practices. He was, in turn, supported by the Soviet propaganda machine, which overstated his successes, cited faked experimental results, and omitted mention of his failures.

Lysenko's political success was mostly due to his appeal to the Communist Party and Soviet ideology. Following the disastrous collectivization efforts of the late 1920s, Lysenko's "new" methods were seen by Soviet officials as paving the way to an "agricultural revolution." Lysenko himself was from a peasant family, and was an enthusiastic advocate of Leninism. The Party-controlled newspapers applauded Lysenko's "practical" efforts and questioned the motives of his critics. Lysenko's "revolution in agriculture" had a powerful propaganda advantage over the academics, who urged the patience and observation required for science. Lysenko was admitted into the hierarchy of the Communist Party, and was put in charge of agricultural affairs. He used his position to denounce biologists as "fly-lovers and people haters," and to decry the "wreckers" in biology, who he claimed were trying to disable the Soviet economy and cause it to fail. Furthermore, he denied the distinction between theoretical and applied biology and concepts such as control groups and statistics in general:

Lysenko presented himself as a follower of Ivan Vladimirovich Michurin, a well-known and well-liked Soviet horticulturist, but unlike Michurin, he advocated a form of Lamarckism, insisting on using only hybridization and grafting, as non-genetic techniques.

Support from Joseph Stalin increased Lysenko's momentum and popularity. In 1935, Lysenko compared his opponents in biology to the peasants who still resisted the Soviet government's collectivization strategy, saying that by opposing his theories, the traditional geneticists were setting themselves against Marxism. Stalin was in the audience when this speech was made, and he was the first one to stand and applaud, calling out "Bravo, Comrade Lysenko. Bravo." 
Joseph Stalin personally edited a speech by Lysenko in a way that reflected his support, despite his skepticism toward Lysenko's assertion that all science is class-oriented in nature. The official support emboldened Lysenko, and gave him and Prezent free rein to slander any geneticists who still spoke out against him. After the appointment of Lysenko as head of the Soviet Academy of Agricultural Sciences, classical genetics began to be publicly called "fascist science" and many of Lysenkoism's opponents, such as his former mentor Nikolai Ivanovich Vavilov, were imprisoned or executed because of their denunciations, although Lysenko wasn't directly responsible for this incident. 

On August 7, 1948, at the end of a week-long session organized by Lysenko and approved by Stalin, the Academy of Agricultural Sciences (VASKhNIL) announced that from that point on Lysenkoism would be taught as "the only correct theory." Soviet scientists were forced to denounce any work that contradicted Lysenko. Criticism of Lysenko was denounced as "bourgeois" or "fascist," and analogous "non-bourgeois" theories also flourished in other fields such as linguistics and art in the Soviet academy at this time. Perhaps the only opponents of Lysenkoism during Stalin's lifetime to escape liquidation were from the small community of Soviet nuclear physicists: as Tony Judt has observed, "It is significant that Stalin left his nuclear physicists alone and never presumed to second guess their calculations. Stalin may well have been mad but he was not stupid."

Effects

From 1934 to 1940, under Lysenko's admonitions and with Stalin's approval, many geneticists were executed (including Izrail Agol, Solomon Levit, Grigorii Levitskii, Georgii Karpechenko and Georgii Nadson) or sent to labor camps. The famous Soviet geneticist and president of the Agriculture Academy, Nikolai Vavilov, was arrested in 1940 and died in prison in 1943.

In 1936, the American geneticist Hermann Joseph Muller, who had moved to the Leningrad Institute of Genetics with his Drosophila fruit flies, was criticized as a bourgeois, capitalist, imperialist, and promoter of fascism, so he left the USSR, returning to America via Republican Spain. In 1948, genetics was officially declared "a bourgeois pseudoscience". Over 3,000 biologists were imprisoned, fired or executed for attempting to oppose Lysenkoism and genetics research was effectively destroyed until the death of Stalin in 1953. Due to Lysenkoism, crop yields in the USSR actually declined.

Fall

At the end of 1952, the situation started to change, and newspapers published articles criticizing Lysenkoism. However, the return to regular genetics slowed down in Nikita Khrushchev's time, when Lysenko showed him the supposed successes of an experimental agricultural complex. It was once again forbidden to criticize Lysenkoism, though it was now possible to express different views, and the geneticists imprisoned under Stalin were released or rehabilitated posthumously. The ban was finally waived in the mid-1960s. In the West, meanwhile, Lysenkoism increasingly became seen as pseudoscience.

Reappearance

In the 21st century, Lysenkoism is again being discussed in Russia, including in "respectable" newspapers like Kultura and by biologists. The geneticist Lev Zhivotovsky has made the unsupported claim that Lysenko helped found modern developmental biology. Discoveries in the field of epigenetics were  sometimes raised as alleged late confirmation of Lysenko theory, but in spite of the apparent high-level similarity (heritable traits passed without DNA alterations), Lysenko believed that environment-induced changes are the primary mechanism of heritability. Heritable epigenetic effects were found but are minor as compared to genetic and often unstable.

In other countries
Other countries of the Eastern Bloc accepted Lysenkoism as the official "new biology", to varying degrees.

In Communist Poland, Lysenkoism was aggressively pushed by state propaganda. State newspapers attacked "damage caused by bourgeois Mendelism-Morganism," "imperialist genetics," compared it to Mein Kampf — for example, Trybuna Ludu published an article titled "French scientists recognize superiority of Soviet science" by Pierre Daix, a French communist and chief editor of Les Lettres Françaises, who basically reworded Soviet propaganda claims, which was intended to create an impression that Lysenkoism was already accepted by the whole progressive world. The scientific community, however, opposed the introduction of Lysenkoism. Some academics accepted it for political reasons, with Wacław Gajewski being a notable and vocal opponent to forced introduction of Lysenkoism into universities. As a result he was denied contact with students, but was able to continue his scientific work at the Warsaw botanical garden. Lysenkoism was rapidly rejected starting from 1956 and the first department of genetics, at the University of Warsaw, was founded in 1958 with Gajewski as its head.

Communist Czechoslovakia adopted Lysenkoism in 1949. Jaroslav Kříženecký (1896–1964) was one of the prominent Czechoslovak geneticists opposing Lysenkoism, and when he criticized Lysenkoism in his lectures, he was dismissed from the Agricultural University in 1949 for "serving the established capitalistic system, considering himself superior to the working class, and being hostile to the democratic order of the people," and imprisoned in 1958.

In the German Democratic Republic, although Lysenkoism was taught at some of the universities, it had very little impact on science due to the actions of a few scientists (for example, the geneticist and fierce critic of Lysenkoism, Hans Stubbe) and information exchange with West Berlin research institutions. Nonetheless, Lysenkoist theories were found in schoolbooks as late as the dismissal of Nikita Khrushchev in 1964.

Lysenkoism dominated Chinese science from 1949 until 1956, particularly during the Great Leap Forward, when, during a genetics symposium opponents of Lysenkoism were permitted to freely criticize it and argue for Mendelian genetics. In the proceedings from the symposium, Tan Jiazhen is quoted as saying "Since [the] USSR started to criticize Lysenko, we have dared to criticize him too". For a while, both schools were permitted to coexist, although the influence of the Lysenkoists remained large for several years, contributing to the Great Famine through loss of yields.

Almost alone among Western scientists, John Desmond Bernal, Professor of Physics at Birkbeck College, London, a Fellow of the Royal Society, and a communist, made an aggressive public defence of Lysenko.

See also
 Anti-intellectualism
 Deutsche Physik
 Junk science
 Pavlovian session
 Politicization of science
 Suppressed research in the Soviet Union

References

Further reading
 Denis Buican, L'éternel retour de Lyssenko, Paris, Copernic, 1978.
 Ronald Fisher, "What Sort of Man is Lysenko?" Listener, 40 (1948): 874–875. Contemporary commentary by a British evolutionary biologist (pdf format)
 Loren Graham, "Stalinist Ideology and the Lysenko Affair", in Science in Russia and the Soviet Union (New York: Cambridge University Press, 1993).
 Oren Solomon Harman, "C. D. Darlington and the British and American Reaction to Lysenko and the Soviet Conception of Science." Journal of the History of Biology, Vol. 36 No. 2 (New York: Springer, 2003)
 David Joravsky, The Lysenko Affair (Chicago: University of Chicago Press, 1970).
 Richard Levins and Richard Lewontin, "Lysenkoism", in The Dialectical Biologist (Boston: Harvard University Press, 1985).
 Anton Lang, "Michurin, Vavilov, and Lysenko". Science, Vol. 124 No. 3215, 1956)
 Roger Pearson, "Activist Lysenkoism: The Case of Barry Mehler". In Race, Intelligence and Bias in Academe (Washington: Scott-Townsend Publishers, 1997).
 Valery N. Soyfer, Lysenko and the Tragedy of Soviet Science (New Brunswick, New Jersey: Rutgers University Press, 1994).
 "The Disastrous Effects of Lysenkoism on Soviet Agriculture". Science and Its Times, ed. Neil Schlager and Josh Lauer, Vol. 6. (Detroit: Gale, 2001)

External links
 SkepDic.com – 'Lysenkoism', The Skeptic's Dictionary
 Lysenkoism, BBC Radio 4 discussion with Robert Service, Steve Jones & Catherine Merridale (In Our Time, June 5, 2008)

Anti-intellectualism
Denialism
Politics of the Soviet Union
Lamarckism
Non-Darwinian evolution
Obsolete biology theories
Political terminology
Politics of science
Pseudoscience
Science and technology in the Soviet Union
Science and technology in Ukraine
Scientific misconduct incidents
Soviet phraseology
Ukrainian Soviet Socialist Republic